Turkey, officially the Republic of Türkiye, is a transcontinental country located mainly on the Anatolian Peninsula in Western Asia, with a small portion on the Balkan Peninsula in Southeast Europe. It borders the Black Sea to the north; Georgia to the northeast; Armenia, Azerbaijan, and Iran to the east; Iraq to the southeast; Syria and the Mediterranean Sea to the south; the Aegean Sea to the west; and Greece and Bulgaria to the northwest. Cyprus is off the south coast. Most of the country's citizens are ethnic Turks, while Kurds are the largest ethnic minority. Ankara is Turkey's capital and second-largest city; Istanbul is its largest city and main financial centre.

One of the world's earliest permanently settled regions, present-day Turkey was home to important Neolithic sites like Göbekli Tepe, and was inhabited by ancient civilizations including the Hattians, Hittites, Anatolian peoples, Mycenaean Greeks, Persians, and others.

Following the conquests of Alexander the Great which started the Hellenistic period, most of the ancient regions were culturally Hellenized, and this continued during the Byzantine era. The Seljuk Turks began migrating to Anatolia in the 11th century, which started the Turkification process. The Seljuk Sultanate of Rum ruled Anatolia until the Mongol invasion in 1243, when it disintegrated into small Turkish principalities. Beginning in the late 13th century, the Ottomans united the principalities and conquered the Balkans, while the Turkification of Anatolia further progressed during the Ottoman period. After Mehmed II conquered Constantinople (now Istanbul) in 1453, Ottoman expansion continued under Selim I. During the reign of Suleiman the Magnificent, the Ottoman Empire became a global power.

From the late 18th century onwards, the empire's power declined with a gradual loss of territories. Mahmud II started a period of modernization in the early 19th century. The Young Turk Revolution of 1908 restricted the authority of the Sultan and restored the Ottoman Parliament after a 30-year suspension, ushering the empire into a multi-party period. The Three Pashas took control with the 1913 coup d'état, and the Ottoman Empire entered World War I as one of the Central Powers in 1914. During the war, the Ottoman government committed genocides against its Armenian, Greek and Assyrian subjects. After its defeat in the war, the Ottoman Empire was partitioned.

The Turkish War of Independence against the occupying Allied Powers resulted in the abolition of the Sultanate on 1 November 1922, the signing of the Treaty of Lausanne (which superseded the Treaty of Sèvres) on 24 July 1923 and the proclamation of the Republic on 29 October 1923. With the reforms initiated by the country's first president, Mustafa Kemal Atatürk, Turkey became a secular, unitary and parliamentary republic. Turkey remained neutral during most of World War II, but entered the closing stages of the war on the side of the Allies.

Turkey played a prominent role in the Korean War and joined NATO in 1952. During the Cold War years, the country endured two military coups in 1960 and 1980, and a period of economic and political turmoil in the 1970s. The economy was liberalized in the 1980s, leading to stronger economic growth and political stability. Since 2002, the country's political system has been dominated by the AKP and its leader Recep Tayyip Erdoğan, under whom a decade of rapid growth in nominal GDP took place until 2013, which was followed by a period of recession and stagnation in terms of USD-based nominal GDP between 2013 and 2020, and high inflation as of 2023. The AKP government's initial economic achievements, which were financed through privatization revenues and loans, were overshadowed by democratic backsliding and an erosion in the separation of powers and civil liberties, which gained momentum after the parliamentary republic was replaced by an executive presidential system with a referendum in 2017.

Turkey is a regional power with a geopolitically significant strategic location. The economy of Turkey, which is a founding member of the OECD and G20, is classified among the E7, EAGLEs and NICs, and currently ranks twentieth-largest in the world by nominal GDP and eleventh-largest by PPP. Turkey is a charter member of the United Nations, the IMF and the World Bank; a founding member of the OSCE, OIC, BSEC, ECO, MIKTA, TURKSOY and OTS; and an early member of NATO. After becoming one of the early members of the Council of Europe in 1950, Turkey became an associate member of the EEC in 1963, joined the EU Customs Union in 1995, and started accession negotiations with the European Union in 2005. Turkey has a rich cultural legacy shaped by centuries of history and the influence of the various peoples that have inhabited its territory over several millennia; it is home to 19 UNESCO World Heritage Sites and is among the most visited countries in the world.

Name

The English name Turkey (from Medieval Latin /) means "land of the Turks". The phrase  is used in the 15th-century Digby Mysteries. Later usages can be found in the William Dunbar poems, the 16th century  (Turkie) and Francis Bacon's  (Turky). The spelling Turkey dates back to at least 1719.

The name Turkey appeared in Western sources after the Crusades. In the 14th-century Arabic sources, Turkiyya is usually contrasted with Turkmaniyya (Turkomania), probably to be understood as Oghuz in a broad sense. With the Treaty of Alexandropol signed by the Government of the Grand National Assembly with Armenia, the name Türkiye entered international documents for the first time. In the treaty signed with Afghanistan, the expression Devlet-i Âliyye-i Türkiyye ("Sublime Turkish State") was used, likened to the Ottoman Empire's name.

Official name change
In December 2021, the country issued a circular, calling for exports to be labeled "Made in Türkiye". The circular also stated that in relation to other governmental communications, the "necessary sensitivity will be shown on the use of the phrase 'Türkiye' instead of phrases such as 'Turkey', 'Türkei', 'Turquie', etc." The reason given in the circular for preferring Türkiye was that it "represents and expresses the culture, civilization, and values of the Turkish nation in the best way". According to Turkish state broadcaster TRT World, it was also to avoid pejorative associations with the birds. The government notified the United Nations and other international organizations on 31 May 2022, requesting that they use Türkiye, which the UN immediately agreed to do. The United States Department of State officially began using Türkiye in January 2023.

History

Prehistory of Anatolia and Eastern Thrace

The Anatolian peninsula, comprising most of modern Turkey, is one of the oldest permanently settled regions in the world. Various ancient Anatolian populations have lived in Anatolia, from at least the Neolithic until the Hellenistic period. Many of these peoples spoke the Anatolian languages, a branch of the larger Indo-European language family. Given the antiquity of the Indo-European Hittite and Luwian languages, some scholars have proposed Anatolia as the hypothetical centre from which the Indo-European languages radiated. The European part of Turkey, called Eastern Thrace, has been inhabited since at least 40,000 years ago, and is known to have been in the Neolithic era by about 6000 BC. The spread of agriculture from the Middle East to Europe was strongly correlated with the migration of early farmers from Anatolia about 9,000 years ago, and was not just a cultural exchange. Anatolian Neolithic farmers derived a significant portion of their ancestry from the Anatolian hunter-gatherers.

Göbekli Tepe is the site of the oldest known man-made structure in the world, a temple dating to circa 9600 BC, while Çatalhöyük is a very large Neolithic and Chalcolithic settlement in Anatolia, which existed from approximately 7500 BC to 5700 BC. It is the largest and best-preserved Neolithic site found to date. Nevalı Çori was an early Neolithic settlement on the middle Euphrates, in Şanlıurfa. The Urfa Man statue is dated c. 9000 BC, to the period of the Pre-Pottery Neolithic, and is defined as "the oldest known naturalistic life-sized sculpture of a human". It is considered to be contemporaneous with Göbekli Tepe. Troy was first settled in the Neolithic Age, with inhabitation continuing into the Byzantine period. Troy's Late Bronze Age layers are considered potential historical settings for the later legends of the Trojan War.

The earliest recorded inhabitants of Anatolia were the Hattians and Hurrians, non-Indo-European peoples who lived in Anatolia, respectively, as early as c. 2300 BC. Indo-European Hittites came to Anatolia and gradually absorbed the Hattians and Hurrians c. 2000–1700 BC. The first empire in the area was founded by the Hittites, from the 18th through the 13th centuries BC. The Assyrians conquered and settled parts of southeastern Turkey as early as 1950 BC although they have remained a minority in the region.

Following the collapse of the Hittite empire c. 1180 BC, the Phrygians, an Indo-European people, achieved ascendancy in Anatolia until their kingdom was destroyed by the Cimmerians in c. 695 BC. The most powerful of Phrygia's successor states were Lydia, Caria and Lycia.

Assyrian king Shalmaneser I (1263–1234 BC) recorded a campaign in which he subdued the entire territory of "Uruatri". Urartu re-emerged in Assyrian inscriptions in the 9th century BC. Starting from 714 BC, the Urartu state began to decline, and finally dissolved in 590 BC, when it was conquered by the Medes.

The city of Sardis served as the capital of the ancient kingdom of Lydia. As one of the seven churches of Asia, it was addressed in the Book of Revelation, the final book of the New Testament. The Lydian Lion coins were made of electrum, a naturally occurring alloy of gold and silver. During the reign of King Croesus, the metallurgists of Sardis discovered the way of separating gold from silver, thereby producing both metals of a purity never known before.

Antiquity

Starting around 1200 BC, the coast of Anatolia was settled by Aeolian and Ionian Greeks. Numerous important cities were founded by these colonists, such as Miletus, Ephesus, Halicarnassus, Pergamon, Aphrodisias, Smyrna (now İzmir) and Byzantium (now Istanbul), the latter founded by Greek colonists from Megara in c. 667 BC. Some of the most prominent pre-Socratic philosophers lived in the city of Miletus. Thales of Miletus (c. 624 BC – c. 546 BC) is regarded as the first philosopher in the Greek tradition, and is also historically recognized as the first individual known to have engaged in scientific philosophy. Thales is often referred to as the "Father of Science". In Miletus, he was followed by two other significant philosophers, Anaximander (c. 610 BC – c. 546 BC) and Anaximenes (c. 585 BC – c. 525 BC) (known collectively, to modern scholars, as the Milesian school). For several centuries prior to the first Persian invasion of Greece, perhaps the greatest and wealthiest city of the Greek world was Miletus, which founded more colonies than any other Greek city, particularly in the Black Sea region. Diogenes the Cynic was one of the founders of the Cynic philosophy, born in an Ionian colony, Sinope, on the Black Sea coast of Anatolia, in 412 BC.

The first state that was called Armenia by the neighboring peoples was the state of the Armenian Orontid dynasty, which included parts of what is now eastern Turkey, beginning in the 6th century BC. In northwestern Turkey, the most significant tribal group in ancient Thrace was the Odyrisians, founded by Teres I.

All of modern-day Turkey was conquered by the Persian Achaemenid Empire during the 6th century BC. The Greco-Persian Wars started when the Greek city states on the coast of Anatolia rebelled against Persian rule in 499 BC. Queen Artemisia I of the ancient Greek city-state of Halicarnassus, which was then within the Achaemenid satrapy of Caria, fought as an ally of Xerxes I, King of Persia, against the independent Greek city-states during the second Persian invasion of Greece in 480 BC.

Anatolia fell to Alexander the Great in 334 BC, which led to increasing cultural homogeneity and Hellenization in the area. Following Alexander's death in 323 BC, Anatolia was subsequently divided into a number of small Hellenistic kingdoms, all of which became part of the Roman Republic by the mid-1st century BC. The process of Hellenization that began with Alexander's conquest accelerated under Roman rule, and by the early centuries of the Christian Era, the local Anatolian languages and cultures had become extinct, being largely replaced by ancient Greek language and culture.

From the 1st century BC up to the 3rd century AD, large parts of modern-day Turkey were contested between the Romans and neighboring Parthians through the Roman-Parthian Wars.

Galatia was an ancient area in the highlands of central Anatolia inhabited by the Celts. The term "Galatians" came to be used by the Greeks for the three Celtic peoples of Anatolia: the Tectosages, the Trocmii, and the Tolistobogii. By the 1st century BC the Celts had become so Hellenized that some Greek writers called them Hellenogalatai. Galatia was named after the Gauls from Thrace (cf. Tylis), who settled here and became a transient foreign tribe in the 3rd century BC, following the supposed Gallic invasion of the Balkans in 279 BC.

The Kingdom of Pontus was a Hellenistic kingdom, centered in the historical region of Pontus and ruled by the Mithridatic dynasty of Persian origin, which may have been directly related to Darius the Great. The kingdom was proclaimed by Mithridates I in 281 BC and lasted until its conquest by the Romans in 63 BC. The Kingdom of Pontus reached its largest extent under Mithridates VI the Great, who conquered Colchis, Cappadocia, Bithynia, and the Greek colonies of the Tauric Chersonesos. After a long struggle with Rome in the Mithridatic Wars, Pontus was defeated.

All ancient regions and territories corresponding to modern Turkey eventually became part of the Roman Empire, and many of them retained their historic names in classical antiquity as Roman provinces.

Early Christian and Roman period

According to the Acts of Apostles, Antioch (now Antakya), a city in southern Turkey, is where the followers of Jesus were first called "Christians". The city quickly became an important center of Christianity. Apostle Paul of Tarsus traveled to Ephesus and stayed there, probably working as a tentmaker. He is claimed to have performed miracles and organized missionary activity in other regions. Paul left Ephesus after an attack from a local silversmith resulted in a pro-Artemis riot.

According to extrabiblical traditions, the Assumption of Mary took place in Ephesus, where Apostle John was also present. Irenaeus writes of "the church of Ephesus, founded by Paul, with John continuing with them until the times of Trajan." While in Ephesus, Apostle John wrote the three epistles attributed to him. John was allegedly banished by the Roman authorities to the Greek island of Patmos, where he wrote the Book of Revelation. The Basilica of St. John near Ephesus, built by Justinian the Great in the 6th century, marks the burial site of Apostle John, while the nearby House of the Virgin Mary is accepted by the Catholic church as the place where Mary, mother of Jesus, lived the final days of her life, before her Assumption. Saint Nicholas, born in Patara, lived in nearby Myra (modern Demre) in Lycia.

In 123 CE, Roman emperor Hadrian traveled to Anatolia. Numerous monuments were erected for his arrival and he met his lover Antinous from Bithynia. Hadrian focused on the Greek revival and built several temples and improved the cities. Cyzicus, Pergamon, Smyrna, Ephesus and Sardes were promoted as regional centres for the Imperial cult (neocoros) during this period.

Byzantine period

After defeating Licinius (the senior co-emperor (augustus) of the East in Nicomedia) at the Battle of Chrysopolis (Üsküdar) in 324 (thus bringing an end to the Tetrarchy system and becoming the sole emperor), Constantine the Great chose the nearby city of Byzantium across the Bosporus as the new capital of the Roman Empire and started rebuilding and expanding the city. He resided mostly in Nicomedia (modern İzmit) during the construction works in the next six years. In 330 he officially proclaimed it as the new Roman capital with the name New Rome (Nova Roma), but soon afterwards renamed it as Constantinople (Constantinopolis, modern Istanbul). Under Constantine, Christianity did not become the official religion of the state, but enjoyed imperial preference since he supported it with generous privileges.

Theodosius the Great made Christianity the official state religion of the Roman Empire with the Edict of Thessalonica in 380 and was instrumental in establishing the Nicene Creed as the orthodox doctrine for Christianity with the First Council of Constantinople in 381.

Following the death of Theodosius the Great in 395 and the permanent division of the Roman Empire between his two sons, Constantinople became the capital of the Eastern Roman Empire. This empire, which would later be branded by historians as the Byzantine Empire, ruled most of the territory of present-day Turkey until the Late Middle Ages; although the eastern regions remained firmly in Sasanian hands until the 7th century. The frequent Byzantine-Sassanid Wars, a continuation of the centuries-long Roman-Persian Wars, took place between the 4th and 7th centuries.

Several ecumenical councils of the early Church were held in cities located in present-day Turkey, including the First Council of Nicaea (Iznik) in 325 (which resulted in the first uniform Christian doctrine, called the Nicene Creed), the First Council of Constantinople (Istanbul) in 381, the Council of Ephesus in 431, and the Council of Chalcedon (Kadıköy) in 451. During most of its existence, the Byzantine Empire was one of the most powerful economic, cultural, and military forces in Europe. Established in the Roman period, the Ecumenical Patriarchate of Constantinople is the oldest continuously active institution in Istanbul. The First Council of Constantinople in 381 recognized that the rights of the bishop of Constantinople are equal to those of the bishop of Rome.

Great Seljuk Empire

The House of Seljuk originated from the Kınık branch of the Oghuz Turks who resided in the Yabgu Khaganate, on the periphery of the Muslim world, in the 9th century. In the 10th century, the Seljuks started migrating from their ancestral homeland into Persia, which became the administrative core of the Great Seljuk Empire, after its foundation by Tughril.
In the latter half of the 11th century, the Seljuk Turks began penetrating into medieval Armenia and Anatolia. In 1071, the Seljuks defeated the Byzantines at the Battle of Manzikert, starting the Turkification process in the area; the Turkish language and Islam were introduced to Anatolia. The slow transition from a predominantly Christian and Greek-speaking Anatolia to a predominantly Muslim and Turkish-speaking one was underway.

The Mevlevi Order of dervishes, established in Konya during the 13th century by Sufi poet Mevlânâ Rûmî, played a role in the Islamization of the diverse people of Anatolia. Thus, alongside the Turkification of the territory, the culturally Persianized Seljuks set the basis for a Turko-Persian principal culture in Anatolia.

The defeat of the Seljuk armies by the Mongols in 1243 caused the territories of the Seljuk Sultanate of Rûm (Anatolia) to slowly disintegrate into small Turkish principalities.

Ottoman Empire

In the early 14th century, the Ottoman Beylik founded by Osman I started expanding its territory and annexing the nearby Turkish beyliks (principalities) in Anatolia. Within a few decades, during the reign of Murad I (r. 1362–1389), the Ottoman State began expanding into the Balkans, eventually becoming known as the Ottoman Empire. The Ottomans completed their conquest of the Byzantine Empire by capturing its capital, Constantinople, on 29 May 1453: their sultan and commander-in-chief Mehmed II thenceforth being known as Mehmed the Conqueror. Mehmed II further expanded the territories of the Ottoman Empire in Anatolia and the Balkan peninsula. His expedition to Italy (1480–1481), commanded by Gedik Ahmed Pasha, began with the Ottoman invasion of Otranto and the nearby areas in Apulia. The invasion, which had the goal of establishing a foothold on the Italian peninsula for a subsequent conquest of Rome, started on 28 July 1480 and ended on 10 September 1481, four months after Mehmed II's death on 3 May 1481.

Following the end of the Reconquista, which resulted in the expulsion of non-Christians (Jews and Muslims) from Iberia and southern Italy controlled by the Crowns of Castile and Aragon (and later by the Spanish Empire), a large number of Sephardic Jews and Andalusian Muslims emigrated to the Ottoman Empire during the reigns of Sultan Bayezid II and his successors, settling primarily in Istanbul, Izmir, Selanik, Bursa and Edirne.

In 1514, Sultan Selim I (1512–1520) successfully expanded the empire's borders by defeating Shah Ismail I of the Safavid dynasty in the Battle of Chaldiran. In 1517, Selim I expanded Ottoman rule into Algeria and Egypt, and created a naval presence in the Red Sea. Subsequently, a contest started between the Ottoman and Portuguese empires to become the dominant sea power in the Indian Ocean, with a number of naval battles in the Red Sea, the Arabian Sea and the Persian Gulf. The Portuguese presence in the Indian Ocean was perceived as a threat to the Ottoman monopoly over the ancient trade routes between East Asia and Western Europe. Despite the increasingly prominent European presence, the Ottoman Empire's trade with the east continued to flourish until the second half of the 18th century.

The Ottoman Empire's power and prestige peaked in the 16th and 17th centuries, particularly during the reign of Suleiman the Magnificent, who personally instituted major legislative changes relating to society, education, taxation and criminal law.

The empire was often at odds with the Holy Roman Empire in its steady advance towards Central Europe through the Balkans and the southern part of the Polish–Lithuanian Commonwealth.

The Ottoman Navy contended with several Holy Leagues, such as those in 1538, 1571, 1684 and 1717 (composed primarily of Habsburg Spain, the Republic of Genoa, the Republic of Venice, the Knights of St. John, the Papal States, the Grand Duchy of Tuscany and the Duchy of Savoy), for the control of the Mediterranean Sea.

In the east, the Ottomans were often at war with Safavid Persia over conflicts between the 16th and 18th centuries. The Ottoman wars with Persia continued as the Zand, Afsharid, and Qajar dynasties succeeded the Safavids in Iran, until the first half of the 19th century.

Even further east, there was an extension of the Habsburg-Ottoman conflict, in that the Ottomans also had to send soldiers to their farthest and easternmost vassal and territory, the Aceh Sultanate in Southeast Asia, to defend it from European colonizers as well as the Latino invaders who had crossed from Latin America and had Christianized the formerly Muslim-dominated Philippines.

From the 16th to the 20th centuries, the Ottoman Empire also fought twelve wars with the Russian Tsardom and Empire. These were initially about Ottoman territorial expansion and consolidation in southeastern and eastern Europe; but starting from the Russo-Turkish War (1768–1774), they became more about the survival of the Ottoman Empire, which had begun to lose its strategic territories on the northern Black Sea coast to the advancing Russians.

From the second half of the 18th century onwards, the Ottoman Empire began to decline. The Tanzimat reforms, initiated by Mahmud II in 1839, aimed to modernize the Ottoman state in line with the progress that had been made in Western Europe. The efforts of Midhat Pasha during the late Tanzimat era led the Ottoman constitutional movement of 1876, which introduced the First Constitutional Era, but these efforts proved to be inadequate in most fields, and failed to stop the dissolution of the empire.

As the empire gradually shrank in size, military power and wealth; especially after the Ottoman economic crisis and default in 1875 which led to uprisings in the Balkan provinces that culminated in the Russo-Turkish War (1877–1878); many Balkan Muslims migrated to the Empire's heartland in Anatolia, along with the Circassians fleeing the Russian conquest of the Caucasus. According to some estimates, 800,000 Muslim Circassians died during the Circassian genocide in the territory of present-day Russia, the survivors of which sought refuge in the Ottoman Empire, mostly settling in the provinces of present-day Turkey. The decline of the Ottoman Empire led to a rise in nationalist sentiment among its various subject peoples, leading to increased ethnic tensions which occasionally burst into violence, such as the Hamidian massacres of Armenians, which claimed up to 300,000 lives.

The loss of Rumelia (Ottoman territories in Europe) with the First Balkan War (1912–1913) was followed by the arrival of millions of Muslim refugees (muhacir) to Istanbul and Anatolia. Historically, the Rumelia Eyalet and Anatolia Eyalet had formed the administrative core of the Ottoman Empire, with their governors titled Beylerbeyi participating in the Sultan's Divan, so the loss of all Balkan provinces beyond the Midye-Enez border line according to the London Conference of 1912–13 and the Treaty of London (1913) was a major shock for the Ottoman society and led to the 1913 Ottoman coup d'état. In the Second Balkan War (1913) the Ottomans managed to recover their former capital Edirne (Adrianople) and its surrounding areas in East Thrace, which was formalized with the Treaty of Constantinople (1913). The 1913 coup d'état effectively put the country under the control of the Three Pashas, making sultans Mehmed V and Mehmed VI largely symbolic figureheads with no real political power.

The Ottoman Empire entered World War I on the side of the Central Powers and was ultimately defeated. The Ottomans successfully defended the Dardanelles strait during the Gallipoli campaign (1915–1916) and achieved initial victories against British forces in the first two years of the Mesopotamian campaign, such as the Siege of Kut (1915–1916); but the Arab Revolt (1916–1918) turned the tide against the Ottomans in the Middle East. In the Caucasus campaign, however, the Russian forces had the upper hand from the beginning, especially after the Battle of Sarikamish (1914–1915). Russian forces advanced into northeastern Anatolia and controlled the major cities there until retreating from World War I with the Treaty of Brest-Litovsk following the Russian Revolution (1917). During the war, the empire's Armenian subjects were deported to Syria as part of the Armenian genocide. As a result, an estimated 600,000 to more than 1 million, or up to 1.5 million Armenians were killed. The Turkish government has refused to acknowledge the events as genocide and states that Armenians were only "relocated" from the eastern war zone. Genocidal campaigns were also committed against the empire's other minority groups such as the Assyrians and Greeks.

Following the Armistice of Mudros in 1918, the victorious Allied Powers sought to partition the Ottoman state through the 1920 Treaty of Sèvres.

Republic of Turkey

The occupation of Istanbul (1918) and İzmir (1919) by the Allies in the aftermath of World War I initiated the Turkish National Movement. Under the leadership of Mustafa Kemal Pasha, a military commander who had distinguished himself during the Battle of Gallipoli, the Turkish War of Independence (1919–1923) was waged with the aim of revoking the terms of the Treaty of Sèvres (1920).

In 1922, the Greek, Armenian and French armies had been expelled, and the Turkish Provisional Government in Ankara, which had declared itself the legitimate government of the country on 23 April 1920, started to formalize the legal transition from the old Ottoman into the new Republican political system. On 1 November 1922, the Turkish Parliament in Ankara formally abolished the Sultanate, thus ending 623 years of monarchical Ottoman rule.

The Treaty of Lausanne of 24 July 1923, which superseded the Treaty of Sèvres, led to the international recognition of the sovereignty of the newly formed "Republic of Turkey" as the successor state of the Ottoman Empire, and the republic was officially proclaimed on 29 October 1923 in Ankara, the country's new capital. The Lausanne Convention stipulated a population exchange between Greece and Turkey.

Mustafa Kemal became the republic's first President and introduced many reforms. The reforms aimed to transform the old religion-based and multi-communal Ottoman constitutional monarchy into a Turkish nation state that would be governed as a parliamentary republic under a secular constitution. With the Surname Law of 1934, the Turkish Parliament bestowed upon Mustafa Kemal the honorific surname "Atatürk" (Father Turk).

The Montreux Convention (1936) restored Turkey's control over the Turkish Straits, including the right to militarize the coastlines of the Dardanelles and Bosporus straits and the Sea of Marmara, and to block maritime traffic in wartime.

After the establishment of the republic, some Kurdish and Zaza tribes, which were feudal (manorial) communities led by chieftains (agha) during the Ottoman era, became discontent about Atatürk's reforms aiming to modernize the country, such as secularism (the Sheikh Said rebellion, 1925) and land reform (the Dersim rebellion, 1937–1938), and staged armed revolts.

İsmet İnönü became the country's second president following Atatürk's death on 10 November 1938. In 1939, the Republic of Hatay voted in favor of joining Turkey with a referendum. Turkey remained neutral during most of World War II, but entered the closing stages of the war on the side of the Allies on 23 February 1945. Later that year, Turkey became a charter member of the United Nations. In 1950 Turkey became a member of the Council of Europe.

The Democrat Party won the 1950, 1954 and 1957 general elections and remained in power for a decade, with Adnan Menderes as the prime minister and Celâl Bayar as the president. After fighting as part of the UN forces in the Korean War, Turkey joined NATO in 1952, becoming a bulwark against Soviet expansion into the Mediterranean. Turkey subsequently became a founding member of the OECD in 1961, and an associate member of the EEC in 1963.

The country's transition to multi-party democracy was interrupted by military coups in 1960 and 1980, as well as by military memorandums in 1971 and 1997. Between 1960 and the end of the 20th century, the prominent leaders in Turkish politics who achieved multiple election victories were Süleyman Demirel, Bülent Ecevit and Turgut Özal. Tansu Çiller became the first female prime minister of Turkey in 1993.

Following the liberalization of the economy in the 1980s, Turkey experienced stronger GDP growth and greater political stability in the last two decades of the 20th century; but inflation remained high throughout this period, and the GDP growth was interrupted by three economic crises in 1990, 1994 and 2000–2001.

Turkey applied for full membership of the EEC in 1987, joined the European Union Customs Union in 1995 and started accession negotiations with the European Union in 2005. In a non-binding vote on 13 March 2019, the European Parliament called on the EU governments to suspend EU accession talks with Turkey, citing violations of human rights and the rule of law; but the negotiations, effectively on hold since 2018, remain active as of 2023.

In 2014, Turkish prime minister Recep Tayyip Erdoğan won Turkey's first presidential election. On 15 July 2016, an unsuccessful coup attempt tried to oust the government.

With a referendum in 2017, the parliamentary republic has been replaced by an executive presidential system. The office of the prime minister has been abolished and its powers and duties have been transferred to the president. On the referendum day, while the voting was still underway, the Supreme Electoral Council of Turkey lifted a rule that required each ballot to have an official stamp. The opposition parties have claimed that as many as 2.5 million ballots without a stamp were accepted as valid.

In 2018, Erdoğan won the presidential election for a second term, which ends in 2023. The 2023 Turkish presidential election is scheduled to take place on 18 June 2023 as part of the 2023 general elections, alongside parliamentary elections. President Erdoğan has signalled that the election might be held early, on 14 May 2023. According to Article 101 of the Constitution of Turkey: "A person can be elected as President maximum two times" (Turkish: "Bir kimse en fazla iki defa Cumhurbaşkanı seçilebilir"). No amendments have been made to this definition in Article 101 with the referendum in 2017.

Administrative divisions

Turkey has a unitary structure in terms of administration and this aspect is one of the most important factors shaping the Turkish public administration. Turkey does not have a federal system, and the provinces are subordinate to the central government in Ankara.

When three powers (executive, legislative and judiciary) are taken into account as the main functions of the state, local administrations have little power. Local administrations were established to provide services in place and the government is represented by the province governors (vali) and town governors (kaymakam).

Other senior public officials are also appointed by the central government, except for the mayors (belediye başkanı) who are elected by the constituents. Turkish municipalities have local legislative bodies (belediye meclisi) for decision-making on municipal issues.

Within this unitary framework, Turkey is subdivided into 81 provinces (il or vilayet) for administrative purposes. Each province is divided into districts (ilçe), for a total of 973 districts. Turkey is also subdivided into 7 regions (bölge) and 21 subregions for geographic, demographic and economic purposes; this does not refer to an administrative division.

Government and politics

Turkey is a presidential republic within a multi-party system. The current constitution was approved by referendum in 1982, which determines the government's structure, lays forth the ideals and standards of the state's conduct, and sets out the state's responsibility to its citizens. Furthermore, the constitution specifies the people's rights and obligations, as well as principles for the delegation and exercise of sovereignty that belongs to the people of Turkey. Turkish politics have become increasingly associated with democratic backsliding, being described as a competitive authoritarian system.

In the Turkish unitary system, citizens are subject to three levels of government: national, provincial, and local. The local government's duties are commonly split between municipal governments and districts, in which the executive and legislative officials are elected by a plurality vote of citizens by district. Turkey is subdivided into 81 provinces for administrative purposes. Each province is divided into districts, for a total of 973 districts.

The government, regulated by a system of separation of powers as defined by the constitution of Turkey, comprises three branches:
 Legislative: The unicameral Parliament makes laws, debates and adopts the budget bills, declares war, approves treaties, proclaims amnesty and pardon, and has the power of impeachment, by which it can remove incumbent members of the government.
 Executive: The president is the commander-in-chief of the military, can veto legislative bills before they become law (subject to parliamentary override), can issue presidential decrees on matters regarding executive power with the exception of fundamental rights, individual rights and certain political rights (parliamentary laws prevail presidential decrees), and appoints the members of the Cabinet and other officers, who administer and enforce national laws and policies.
 Judicial: The Constitutional Court (for constitutional adjudication and review of individual applications concerning human rights), the Court of Cassation (final decision maker in ordinary judiciary), the Council of State (final decision maker in administrative judiciary) and the Court of Jurisdictional Disputes (for resolving the disputes between courts for constitutional jurisdiction) are the four organizations that are described by the Constitution as supreme courts. The judges of the Constitutional Court are appointed by the president and the parliament.

The Parliament has 600 voting members, each representing a constituency for a five-year term. Parliamentary seats are distributed among the provinces by population, conforming with the census apportionment. The president is elected by direct vote and serves a five-year term. The president can't run for re-elections after two terms of five-years, unless the parliament prematurely renews the presidential elections during the second term of the President. Elections for the Parliament and presidential elections are held on the same day. The Constitutional Court is composed of fifteen members. A member is elected for a term of twelve years and can't be re-elected. The members of the Constitutional Court are obliged to retire when they are over the age of sixty-five.

Parties and elections

Elections in Turkey are held for six functions of government: presidential elections (national), parliamentary elections (national), municipality mayors (local), district mayors (local), provincial or municipal council members (local) and muhtars (local). Apart from elections, referendums are also held occasionally.

Every Turkish citizen who has turned 18 has the right to vote and stand as a candidate at elections. Universal suffrage for both sexes has been applied throughout Turkey since 1934 and before most countries. In Turkey, turnout rates of both local and general elections are high compared to many other countries, which usually stands higher than 80 percent. There are 600 members of parliament who are elected for a five-year term by a party-list proportional representation system from 88 electoral districts. 
The Constitutional Court can strip the public financing of political parties that it deems anti-secular or having ties to terrorism, or ban their existence altogether. The Interior Ministry can block new parties from elections even if a court rules in favour of the party. The electoral threshold for political parties at national level is seven percent of the votes. Smaller parties can avoid the electoral threshold by forming an alliance with other parties, in which it is sufficient that the total votes of the alliance passes 7%. Independent candidates are not subject to an electoral threshold.

After World War II, starting from 1946, Turkey operated under a multi-party system. On the right side of the Turkish political spectrum, parties like the Democrat Party (DP), Justice Party (AP), Motherland Party (ANAP) and Justice and Development Party (AKP) became the most popular political parties in Turkey, winning numerous elections. Turkish right-wing parties are more likely to embrace the principles of political ideologies such as conservatism, nationalism or Islamism. On the left side of the spectrum, parties like the Republican People's Party (CHP), Social Democratic Populist Party (SHP) and Democratic Left Party (DSP) once enjoyed the largest electoral success. Left-wing parties are more likely to embrace the principles of socialism, Kemalism or secularism.

The 12th President, Recep Tayyip Erdoğan (AKP), winner of the 2018 presidential election and former prime minister, is currently serving as the head of state and head of government. Kemal Kılıçdaroğlu (CHP) is the main opposition leader in Turkey. Mustafa Şentop is the Speaker of the Grand National Assembly.

The 2018 parliamentary election was held for voting into office the members of the 27th Parliament of Turkey, which had an initial composition of 295 seats for the Justice and Development Party (AKP), 146 seats for the Republican People's Party (CHP), 67 seats for the Peoples' Democratic Party (HDP), 49 seats for the Nationalist Movement Party (MHP) and 49 seats for the Good Party (İP). The next parliamentary election is scheduled to take place in 2023.

Law

With the founding of the Republic, Turkey adopted a civil law legal system, replacing Sharia-derived Ottoman law. The Civil Code, adopted in 1926, was based on the Swiss Civil Code of 1907 and the Swiss Code of Obligations of 1911. Although it underwent a number of changes in 2002, it retains much of the basis of the original Code. The Criminal Code, originally based on the Italian Criminal Code, was replaced in 2005 by a Code with principles similar to the German Penal Code and German law generally. Administrative law is based on the French equivalent and procedural law generally shows the influence of the Swiss, German and French legal systems. Islamic principles do not play a part in the legal system.

Turkey has adopted the principle of the separation of powers. In line with this principle, judicial power is exercised by independent courts on behalf of the Turkish nation. The independence and organization of the courts, the security of the tenure of judges and public prosecutors, the profession of judges and prosecutors, the supervision of judges and public prosecutors, the military courts and their organization, and the powers and duties of the high courts are regulated by the Turkish Constitution.

According to Article 142 of the Turkish Constitution, the organization, duties and jurisdiction of the courts, their functions and the trial procedures are regulated by law. In line with the aforementioned article of the Turkish Constitution and related laws, the court system in Turkey can be classified under three main categories; which are the Judicial Courts, Administrative Courts, and Military Courts. Each category includes first instance courts and high courts. In addition, the Court of Jurisdictional Disputes rules on cases that cannot be classified readily as falling within the purview of one court system.

Law enforcement in Turkey is carried out by several agencies under the jurisdiction of the Ministry of Internal Affairs. These agencies are the General Directorate of Security, the Gendarmerie General Command and the Coast Guard Command. Furthermore, there are other law enforcement agencies with specific (National Intelligence Organization, General Directorate of Customs Protection, etc.) or local (Village guards, Municipal Police, etc.) assignments that are under the jurisdiction of the president or different ministries.

In the years of government by the AKP and Erdoğan, particularly since 2013, the independence and integrity of the Turkish judiciary has increasingly been said to be in doubt by institutions, parliamentarians and journalists both within and outside of Turkey; due to political interference in the promotion of judges and prosecutors, and in their pursuit of public duty. The Turkey 2015 report of the European Commission stated that "the independence of the judiciary and respect of the principle of separation of powers have been undermined and judges and prosecutors have been under strong political pressure."

Foreign relations

Turkey is a founding member of the United Nations (1945), the OECD (1961), the OIC (1969), the OSCE (1973), the ECO (1985), the BSEC (1992), TURKSOY (1993), the D-8 (1997), the G20 (1999), and the OTS (2009). Turkey was a member of the United Nations Security Council in 1951–1952, 1954–1955, 1961 and 2009–2010. In 2012 Turkey became a dialogue partner of the SCO, and in 2013 became a member of the ACD.

In line with its traditional Western orientation, relations with Europe have always been a central part of Turkish foreign policy. Turkey became one of the early members of the Council of Europe in 1950, applied for associate membership of the EEC (predecessor of the European Union) in 1959 and became an associate member in 1963. After decades of political negotiations, Turkey applied for full membership of the EEC in 1987, became an associate member of the Western European Union in 1992, joined the EU Customs Union in 1995 and has been in formal accession negotiations with the European Union since 2005.

Turkey's support for Northern Cyprus in the Cyprus dispute and refusal to include the Republic of Cyprus to the EU-Turkey Customs Union agreement complicates its relations with the European Union and remains a major stumbling block to the country's EU accession bid. The Annan Plan for the island's reunification was approved by the majority of Turkish Cypriots, but rejected by the majority of Greek Cypriots, in separate referendums on April 24, 2004. The Republic of Cyprus was admitted to the EU a week later, on May 1, 2004. According to the 1960 Treaty of Guarantee, the United Kingdom, Greece and Turkey are the three guarantor states on the island.

The other defining aspect of Turkey's foreign policy has been the country's long-standing strategic alliance with the United States. The Truman Doctrine in 1947 enunciated American intentions to guarantee the security of Turkey and Greece during the Cold War, and resulted in large-scale U.S. military and economic support. In 1948 both countries were included in the Marshall Plan and the OEEC for rebuilding European economies.

The common threat posed by the Soviet Union during the Cold War led to Turkey's membership of NATO in 1952, ensuring close bilateral relations with the US. Subsequently, Turkey benefited from the United States' political, economic and diplomatic support, including in key issues such as the country's bid to join the European Union. In the post–Cold War environment, Turkey's geostrategic importance shifted towards its proximity to the Middle East, the Caucasus and the Balkans.

The independence of the Turkic states of the Soviet Union in 1991, with which Turkey shares a common cultural, historic and linguistic heritage, allowed Turkey to extend its economic and political relations deep into Central Asia. The International Organization of Turkic Culture (TURKSOY) was established in 1993, and the Organization of Turkic States (OTS) was established in 2009. The Baku–Tbilisi–Ceyhan pipeline, a multi-billion-dollar oil and natural gas pipeline that extends from Baku in Azerbaijan to the port of Ceyhan in Turkey, forms part of Turkey's foreign policy strategy to become an energy conduit from the Caspian Sea basin to Europe. Turkey sealed its land border with Armenia in a gesture of support to Azerbaijan (a Turkic state in the Caucasus region) during the First (1993) and Second (2020) Nagorno-Karabakh Wars, and it remains closed. Armenia and Turkey started diplomatic talks in order to normalize the relationship between the two countries. The discussions include opening the closed borders and starting trade. Turkey and Armenia have also restarted commercial flights between the two countries.

Following the Arab Spring in December 2010, the choices made by the AKP government for supporting certain political opposition groups in the affected countries have led to tensions with some Arab states, such as Turkey's neighbor Syria since the start of the Syrian civil war, and Egypt after the ousting of President Mohamed Morsi. , Turkey does not have an ambassador in either Syria or Egypt, but relations with both countries have started to improve. Diplomatic relations with Israel were also severed after the Gaza flotilla raid in 2010, but were normalized following a deal in June 2016. These political rifts have left Turkey with few allies in the East Mediterranean, where large natural gas fields have recently been discovered. There is a dispute over Turkey's maritime boundaries with Greece and Cyprus and drilling rights in the eastern Mediterranean.

After the rapprochement with Russia in 2016, Turkey revised its stance regarding the solution of the conflict in Syria. In January 2018, the Turkish military and the Turkish-backed forces, including the Syrian National Army, began an operation in Syria aimed at ousting U.S.-backed YPG (which Turkey considers to be an offshoot of the outlawed PKK) from the enclave of Afrin.

Military

The Turkish Armed Forces consist of the General Staff, the Land Forces, the Naval Forces and the Air Force. The Chief of the General Staff is appointed by the President. The President is responsible to the Parliament for matters of national security and the adequate preparation of the armed forces to defend the country. However, the authority to declare war and to deploy the Turkish Armed Forces to foreign countries or to allow foreign armed forces to be stationed in Turkey rests solely with the Parliament.

The Gendarmerie General Command and the Coast Guard Command are law enforcement agencies with military organization (ranks, structure, etc.) and under the jurisdiction of the Ministry of the Interior. In wartime, the president can order certain units of the Gendarmerie General Command and the Coast Guard Command to operate under the Land Forces Command and Naval Forces Commands respectively. The remaining parts of the Gendarmerie and the Coast Guard continue to carry out their law enforcement missions under the jurisdiction of the Ministry of Interior.

Every fit male Turkish citizen otherwise not barred is required to serve in the military for a period ranging from three weeks to a year, dependent on education and job location. Turkey does not recognize conscientious objection and does not offer a civilian alternative to military service.

Turkey has the second-largest standing military force in NATO, after the United States, with an estimated strength of 890,700 military personnel as of February 2022.

Turkey is one of five NATO member states which are part of the nuclear sharing policy of the alliance, together with Belgium, Germany, Italy, and the Netherlands. A total of 90 B61 nuclear bombs are hosted at the Incirlik Air Base, 40 of which are allocated for use by the Turkish Air Force in case of a nuclear conflict, but their use requires the approval of NATO.

Turkey has participated in international missions under the United Nations and NATO since the Korean War, including peacekeeping missions in Somalia, Yugoslavia and the Horn of Africa. It supported coalition forces in the First Gulf War, contributed military personnel to the International Security Assistance Force in Afghanistan, and remains active in Kosovo Force, Eurocorps and EU Battlegroups. In recent years, Turkey has assisted Peshmerga forces in northern Iraq and the Somali Armed Forces with security and training.

The Turkish Armed Forces have a relatively substantial military presence abroad, with military bases in Albania, Iraq, Qatar, and Somalia. The country also maintains a force of 36,000 troops in Northern Cyprus since 1974.

Human rights

The human rights record of Turkey has been the subject of much controversy and international condemnation. Between 1959 and 2011 the European Court of Human Rights made more than 2400 judgements against Turkey for human rights violations on issues such as Kurdish rights, women's rights, LGBT rights, and media freedom. Turkey's human rights record continues to be a significant obstacle to the country's membership of the EU.

In the latter half of the 1970s, Turkey suffered from political violence between far-left and far-right militant groups, which culminated in the military coup of 1980. The Kurdistan Workers' Party (PKK, designated a terrorist organization by Turkey, the United States, and the European Union) was founded in 1978 by a group of Kurdish militants led by Abdullah Öcalan, seeking the foundation of an independent Kurdish state based on Marxist-Leninist ideology. The initial reason given by the PKK for this was the oppression of Kurds in Turkey. A full-scale insurgency began in 1984, when the PKK announced a Kurdish uprising. With time the PKK modified its demands into equal rights for ethnic Kurds and provincial autonomy within Turkey. Since 1980, the Turkish parliament stripped its members of immunity from prosecution, including 44 deputies most of which from the pro-Kurdish parties.

In 2013, widespread protests erupted, sparked by a plan to demolish Gezi Park but soon growing into general anti-government dissent.

On 20 May 2016, the Turkish parliament stripped almost a quarter of its members of immunity from prosecution, including 101 deputies from the pro-Kurdish HDP and the main opposition CHP party. By 2020, under the pretext of responding to a failed coup attempt in 2016, authorities had arrested or imprisoned more than 90,000 Turkish citizens. According to the Committee to Protect Journalists, the AKP government has waged crackdowns on media freedom. Many journalists have been arrested using charges of "terrorism" and "anti-state activities". In 2020, the CPJ identified 18 jailed journalists in Turkey (including the editorial staff of Cumhuriyet, Turkey's oldest newspaper still in circulation).

LGBT rights

Homosexual activity has been legal in Turkey since 1858. LGBT people have had the right to seek asylum in Turkey under the Geneva Convention since 1951. However, LGBT people in Turkey face discrimination, harassment and even violence from their relatives, neighbors, etc. The Turkish authorities have carried out many discriminatory practices. Despite these, LGBT acceptance in Turkey is growing. In a survey conducted by Kadir Has University in Istanbul in 2016, 33% of respondents said that LGBT people should have equal rights, which increased to 45% in 2020. Another survey by Kadir Has University in 2018 found that the proportion of people who would not want a homosexual neighbor decreased from 55% in 2018 to 47% in 2019. A poll by Ipsos in 2015 found that 27% of the Turkish public was in favor of legalizing same-sex marriage and 19% supported civil unions instead.

When the annual Istanbul Pride was inaugurated in 2003, Turkey became the first Muslim-majority country to hold a gay pride march. Since 2015, all types of parades at Taksim Square and İstiklal Avenue (where, in 2013, the Gezi Park protests took place) have been denied permission by the AKP government, citing security concerns, but hundreds of people have defied the ban each year. Critics have claimed that the bans were in fact ideological.

Geography

Turkey is a transcontinental country bridging Southeastern Europe and Western Asia. Asian Turkey, which includes 97 percent of the country's territory, is separated from European Turkey by the Bosphorus, the Sea of Marmara, and the Dardanelles. European Turkey comprises only 3 percent of the country's territory. The country is encircled by seas on three sides: the Aegean Sea to the west, the Black Sea to the north and the Mediterranean Sea to the south. Turkey also contains the Sea of Marmara in the northwest.

Turkey is divided into seven geographical regions: Marmara, Aegean, Black Sea, Central Anatolia, Eastern Anatolia, Southeastern Anatolia and the Mediterranean. The uneven north Anatolian terrain running along the Black Sea resembles a long, narrow belt. This region comprises approximately one-sixth of Turkey's total land area. As a general trend, the inland Anatolian plateau becomes increasingly rugged as it progresses eastward.
Pamukkale terraces are made of travertine, a sedimentary rock deposited by mineral water from the hot springs. The area is famous for a carbonate mineral left by the flowing of thermal spring water. It is located in Turkey's Inner Aegean region, in the River Menderes (Meander) valley, which has a temperate climate for most of the year. It was added as a UNESCO World Heritage Site in 1988 with Hierapolis.

East Thrace, the European portion of Turkey, is located at the easternmost edge the Balkans. It forms the border between Turkey and its neighbors Greece and Bulgaria. The Asian part of the country mostly consists of the peninsula of Anatolia, which consists of a high central plateau with narrow coastal plains, between the Köroğlu and Pontic mountain ranges to the north and the Taurus Mountains to the south.

Eastern Turkey has a mountainous landscape and is home to the sources of rivers such as the Euphrates, Tigris and Aras. The Southeastern Anatolia Region includes the northern plains of Upper Mesopotamia.

The Lakes Region (Turkish: Göller Yöresi) contains some of the largest lakes in Turkey, such as Lake Beyşehir, Lake Eğirdir, Lake Burdur, Lake Akşehir, Lake Eber and Lake Işıklı. Lake Tuz, Lake Nemrut, Lake Çıldır, Lake İznik, Lake Uluabat, Lake Manyas, Lake Sapanca, Lake Salda, Lake Meke and Lake Uzungöl are among other renowned lakes in Turkey. The rocks along the shoreline of Lake Salda were formed over time by microbes that trap minerals and sediments in the water. These so-called microbialites were once a major form of life on Earth and provide some of the oldest known fossilized records of life on our planet. NASA's Mars 2020 mission Perseverance rover searches for signs of ancient life on the surface of Mars. Studying these microbial fossils from Lake Salda has helped scientists prepare for the mission. In 2021, NASA reported that its Mars surface-exploring rover Perseverance showed that "the minerals and rock deposits at Lake Salda are the nearest match on Earth to those around the Jezero Crater where the spacecraft landed."

Far from the coast the climate of Turkey tends to be continental but elsewhere temperate, and has become hotter, and drier in parts. There are many species of plants and animals.

Most of Turkey is vulnerable to earthquakes. A large portion of the country's landmass is on the Anatolian Plate, which is separated from the Eurasian Plate by the North Anatolian Fault, and from the Arabian Plate by the East Anatolian Fault.

Biodiversity

Turkey's extraordinary ecosystem and habitat diversity has produced considerable species diversity. Anatolia is the homeland of many plants that have been cultivated for food since the advent of agriculture, and the wild ancestors of many plants that now provide staples for humankind still grow in Turkey. The diversity of Turkey's fauna is even greater than that of its flora. The number of animal species in the whole of Europe is around 60,000, while in Turkey there are over 80,000 (over 100,000 counting the subspecies).

The Northern Anatolian conifer and deciduous forests is an ecoregion which covers most of the Pontic Mountains in northern Turkey, while the Caucasus mixed forests extend across the eastern end of the range. The region is home to Eurasian wildlife such as the Eurasian sparrowhawk, golden eagle, eastern imperial eagle, lesser spotted eagle, Caucasian black grouse, red-fronted serin, and wallcreeper. The narrow coastal strip between the Pontic Mountains and the Black Sea is home to the Euxine-Colchic deciduous forests, which contain some of the world's few temperate rainforests. The Turkish pine (Pinus brutia) is mostly found in Turkey and other east Mediterranean countries. The forests of Turkey have other species of Pinus (pine), the Turkey oak and numerous other species of oak. The most commonly found species of the genus Platanus (plane) is the orientalis. Several wild species of tulip are native to Anatolia, and the flower was first introduced to Western Europe with species taken from the Ottoman Empire in the 16th century.

There are 40 national parks, 189 nature parks, 31 nature preserve areas, 80 wildlife protection areas and 109 nature monuments in Turkey such as Gallipoli Peninsula Historical National Park, Mount Nemrut National Park, Ancient Troy National Park, Ölüdeniz Nature Park and Polonezköy Nature Park. In the 21st century, threats to biodiversity include desertification due to climate change in Turkey.

The Anatolian leopard is still found in very small numbers in the northeastern and southeastern regions of Turkey. The Eurasian lynx, the European wildcat and the Caracal are other felid species which are currently found in the forests of Turkey. The Caspian tiger, now extinct, lived in the easternmost regions of Turkey until the latter half of the 20th century.

Renowned domestic animals from Ankara, the capital of Turkey, include the Angora cat, Angora rabbit and Angora goat; and from Van Province the Van cat. The national dog breeds are the Kangal (Anatolian Shepherd), Malaklı and Akbaş.

Climate

The coastal areas of Turkey bordering the Aegean and Mediterranean Seas have a temperate Mediterranean climate, with hot, dry summers and mild to cool, wet winters. The coastal areas bordering the Black Sea have a temperate oceanic climate with warm, wet summers and cool to cold, wet winters. The Turkish Black Sea coast receives the most precipitation and is the only region of Turkey that receives high precipitation throughout the year. The eastern part of the Black Sea coast averages  annually which is the highest precipitation in the country. The coastal areas bordering the Sea of Marmara, which connects the Aegean Sea and the Black Sea, have a transitional climate between a temperate Mediterranean climate and a temperate oceanic climate with warm to hot, moderately dry summers and cool to cold, wet winters. Snow falls on the coastal areas of the Sea of Marmara and the Black Sea almost every winter, but usually melts in no more than a few days. However, snow is rare in the coastal areas of the Aegean Sea and very rare in the coastal areas of the Mediterranean Sea. Winters on the Anatolian plateau are especially severe. Temperatures of  do occur in northeastern Anatolia, and snow may lie on the ground for at least 120 days of the year, and during the entire year on the summits of the highest mountains. In central Anatolia the temperatures can drop below  with the mountains being even colder.

Mountains close to the coast prevent Mediterranean influences from extending inland, giving the central Anatolian plateau of the interior of Turkey a continental climate with sharply contrasting seasons.

Economy

Turkey is a newly industrialized country, with an upper-middle income economy, which is the twentieth-largest in the world by nominal GDP, and the eleventh-largest by PPP. Turkey is one of the Emerging 7 countries. According to IMF estimates, Turkey's GDP per capita by PPP is $40,883 in 2023 and approximately 11.7% of Turks are at risk of poverty or social exclusion as of 2019. Unemployment in Turkey was 13.6% in 2019, and the middle class population in Turkey rose from 18% to 41% of the population between 1993 and 2010 according to the World Bank.

, the foreign currency reserves of the Turkish Central Bank were $74.9 billion (an 8.1% increase compared to the previous month), its gold reserves were $38.5 billion (a 5.1% decrease compared to the previous month), while its official reserve assets stood at $121.3 billion. , the foreign currency deposits of the citizens and residents in Turkish banks stood at $234 billion, equivalent to around half of all deposits.

The EU–Turkey Customs Union in 1995 led to an extensive liberalization of tariff rates, and forms one of the most important pillars of Turkey's foreign trade policy. Foreign direct investment (FDI) in Turkey reached 22.05 billion USD in 2007 and 19.26 billion USD in 2015, but has declined in recent years.

 
The automotive industry in Turkey is sizeable, and produced 1,276,140 motor vehicles in 2021, ranking as the 13th largest producer in the world (production peaked at 1,695,731 motor vehicles in 2017, when Turkey also ranked 13th). Turkish automotive companies like TEMSA, Otokar and BMC are among the world's largest van, bus and truck manufacturers. Togg, or Turkey's Automobile Joint Venture Group Inc., is the first all-electric vehicle company of Turkey. Turkish shipyards are highly regarded both for the production of chemical and oil tankers up to 10,000 dwt and also for their mega yachts. Turkish brands like Beko and Vestel are among the largest producers of consumer electronics and home appliances in Europe, and invest a substantial amount of funds for research and development in new technologies related to these fields.

Other key sectors of the Turkish economy are banking, construction, home appliances, electronics, textiles, oil refining, petrochemical products, food, mining, iron and steel, and machine industry. According to a Turkish Statistical Institute survey in 2021, which used the available data for 2020, it was estimated that 46.7 percent of total disposable income was received by the top 20 percent of income earners, while the lowest 20 percent received only 6.1 percent.

In 2020 the International Energy Agency stated that fossil fuel subsidies should be redirected, for example to the healthcare system. Fossil fuel subsidies were around 0.2% of the GDP during the first two decades of the 21st century, and are higher than clean energy subsidies. The external cost of fossil fuel consumption in 2018 has been estimated as 1.5% of GDP. In 2020 the European Bank for Reconstruction and Development offered to support a just transition away from coal. Increasing the share of renewable energy could reduce inflation.

As of 2023, two Turkish tech startups, Getir and Trendyol, have market valuations above $10 billion. Turkey has seen a growth in the video gaming industry in recent years. Numerous game developing companies have been established and gained investment from venture capitalists. TaleWorlds Entertainment, Peak Games, Bigger Games and Dream Games are the current leaders in this sector.

Tourism

Tourism in Turkey has increased almost every year in the 21st century, and is an important part of the economy. The Turkish Ministry of Culture and Tourism currently promotes Turkish tourism under the project Turkey Home. Turkey is one of the world's top ten destination countries, with the highest percentage of foreign visitors arriving from Europe; specially Germany and Russia in recent years. In 2019, Turkey ranked sixth in the world in terms of the number of international tourist arrivals behind Italy, with 51.2 million foreign tourists visiting the country. Turkey has 19 UNESCO World Heritage Sites, and 84 World Heritage Sites in tentative list. Turkey is home to 519 Blue Flag beaches, which makes it in the third place in the world. Istanbul is the tenth most visited city in the world with 13,433,000 annual visitors as of 2018. Antalya is the second most visited city in Turkey, with over 9 million tourists in 2021.

Infrastructure 

In 2013 there were 98 airports in Turkey, including 22 international airports. Istanbul Airport is planned to be the largest airport in the world, with a capacity to serve 150 million passengers a year. Turkish Airlines uses Istanbul Airport, which has a current annual capacity of serving 90 million passengers, as its main hub and several other airlines operate in the country. Turkish Airlines has scheduled services to 315 destinations in Europe, Asia, Africa, and the Americas, making it the largest mainline carrier in the world by number of countries served.

The motorway network spans  as of 2020.

Opened in 2013, the Marmaray tunnel under the Bosphorus connects the railway and metro lines of Istanbul's European and Asian sides; while the nearby Eurasia Tunnel (2016) provides an undersea road connection for motor vehicles.

Istanbul Metro is the largest metro network in the country with 495 million annual ridership. There are 9 metro lines under service and 6 more under construction.

The Bosphorus Bridge (1973), Fatih Sultan Mehmet Bridge (1988) and Yavuz Sultan Selim Bridge (2016) are the three suspension bridges connecting the European and Asian shores of the Bosphorus strait in Istanbul.

The Çanakkale 1915 Bridge (2022) on the Dardanelles strait, connecting Europe and Asia, is the longest suspension bridge in the world. The Osman Gazi Bridge (2016) connects the northern and southern shores of the Gulf of İzmit.

Turkish State Railways operates both conventional and high speed trains on 12,532 kilometres rail length. The government-owned national railway company started building high-speed rail lines in 2003. The Ankara-Konya line became operational in 2011, while the Ankara-Istanbul line entered service in 2014.

Much energy in Turkey comes from Russia.  Turkey consumes 1700 terawatt hours (TW/h) of primary energy per year, a little over 20 megawatt hours (MW/h) per person, mostly from imported fossil fuels. Although the energy policy of Turkey includes reducing fossil-fuel imports, coal in Turkey is the largest single reason why greenhouse gas emissions by Turkey amount to 1% of the global total. Renewable energy in Turkey is being increased and the Akkuyu Nuclear Power Plant is being built on the Mediterranean coast. However, despite the overcapacity in national electricity generation, fossil fuels are still subsidized.

In 2019 Turkey had the fourth-highest direct utilization and capacity of geothermal power in the world, and produced 45.6% of its electricity from renewable sources.

Many natural gas pipelines span the country's territory. Blue Stream, a major trans-Black Sea gas pipeline, delivers natural gas from Russia to Turkey as does the undersea pipeline, Turkish Stream. The Baku-Tbilisi-Ceyhan pipeline, the second longest oil pipeline in the world, was inaugurated in 2005.

As of 2022, almost all gas consumed in Turkey is imported, but production from the Sakarya Gas Field, a sweet gas field in the Black Sea discovered by TPAO in 2020, is due to start in 2023. A pipeline will connect the gas field to the Filyos Natural-gas Processing Plant, and TPAO plans to begin production in 2023, with an estimated peak production of 40 bcm in 2026. By the end of December 2022, the total volume of natural gas Turkey has discovered in the Black Sea amounted to 710 billion cubic metres (bcm) after a new field was located and a previous find was revised higher.

Science and technology

TÜBİTAK is the leading agency for developing science, technology and innovation policies in Turkey. TÜBA is an autonomous scholarly society acting to promote scientific activities in Turkey. TAEK is the country's official nuclear energy institution, focused on academic research and the development and implementation of peaceful nuclear technology. It is supervising the construction of Turkey's first nuclear facility, Akkuyu Nuclear Power Plant in Mersin, at the cost of $20 billion; the plant is expected to be operational in May 2023, and is projected to meet around 10% of the country's electricity demand.

The Turkish government invests heavily in research and development of military technologies, including Turkish Aerospace Industries, Aselsan, HAVELSAN, Roketsan, and MKE. Turkey is a global leader in unmanned aerial vehicles (UAV); the Bayraktar TB2, manufactured by private defence company Baykar, has been exported to over a dozen countries and played a decisive role in several conflicts, including the 2020 Nagorno-Karabakh war and the 2022 Russian invasion of Ukraine.

Turkey has made significant inroads in aerospace technology into the 21st century.

Türksat, the country's sole communications satellite operator, has launched a series of satellites into orbit; likewise, the Turkish Satellite Assembly, Integration and Test Center (UMET)—a spacecraft production and testing facility owned by the Ministry of National Defence and operated by the TAI—has launched the Göktürk series of Earth observation satellites for reconnaissance; BILSAT-1 and RASAT are the scientific Earth observation satellites operated by the TÜBİTAK Space Technologies Research Institute.

In 2015, Aziz Sancar, a Turkish professor at the University of North Carolina, won the Nobel Prize in Chemistry for his work on how cells repair damaged DNA; he is one of two Turkish Nobel laureates, and the first in the sciences. Other prominent Turkish scientists include physician Hulusi Behçet, who discovered Behçet's disease; mathematician Cahit Arf, who defined the Arf invariant; and immunologists Uğur Şahin and Özlem Türeci, whose German biotechnology company, BioNTech, developed one of the first efficacious vaccines against COVID-19.

Turkey is among the top fifty most innovative countries in the world, ranking 41st in the Global Innovation Index in 2021; this represents a considerable increase since 2011, where it was ranked 65th.

Demographics 

According to the Address-Based Population Recording System of Turkey, the country's population was 84,680,273 in 2021, 93.2% of whom lived in province and district centers, while only 6.8% lived in towns and villages. According to the 2021 estimate, the population increased by 1.27 percent compared to the previous year. In 2021, Turkey had an average population density of 110 people per km2. People within the 15–64 age group constituted 67.9 percent of the total population; the 0–14 age group corresponded to 22.4 percent; while senior citizens aged 65 years or older made up 9.7 percent.

Article 66 of the Turkish Constitution defines a "Turk" as "anyone who is bound to the Turkish state through the bond of citizenship"; therefore, the legal use of the term "Turkish" as a citizen of Turkey is different from the ethnic definition. However approximately 70 to 80 percent of the country's citizens are ethnic Turks. It is estimated that there are at least 47 ethnic groups represented in Turkey. Reliable data on the ethnic mix of the population is not available, because Turkish census figures do not include statistics on ethnicity.

Kurds are the largest non-Turkish ethnicity at anywhere from 12–25 per cent of the population. The exact figure remains a subject of dispute; according to Servet Mutlu, "more often than not, these estimates reflect pro-Kurdish or pro-Turkish sympathies and attitudes rather than scientific facts or erudition". Mutlu's 1990 study estimated Kurds made up around 12 per cent of the population. The Kurds make up a majority in the provinces of Ağrı, Batman, Bingöl, Bitlis, Diyarbakır, Hakkari, Iğdır, Mardin, Muş, Siirt, Şırnak, Tunceli and Van; a near majority in Şanlıurfa Province (47%); and a large minority in Kars Province (20%). In addition, due to internal migration, Kurdish diaspora communities exist in all of the major cities in central and western Turkey. In Istanbul, there are an estimated three million Kurds, making it the city with the largest Kurdish population in the world. Non-Kurdish minorities are believed to make up an estimated 7–12 percent of the population.

The three "Non-Muslim" minority groups recognized in the Treaty of Lausanne were Armenians, Greeks and Jews. Other ethnic groups include Albanians, Arabs, Assyrians, Bosniaks, Circassians, Georgians, Laz, Pomaks, and Roma. Turkey is also home to a Muslim community of Megleno-Romanians.

Before the start of the Syrian civil war in 2011, the estimated number of Arabs in Turkey varied from 1 million to more than 2 million. As of April 2020, there are 3.6 million Syrian refugees in Turkey, who are mostly Arabs but also include Syrian Kurds, Syrian Turkmen, and other ethnic groups of Syria. The vast majority of these are living in Turkey with temporary residence permits. The Turkish government has granted Turkish citizenship to refugees who have joined the Syrian National Army.

Immigration 

Millions of Kurds fled across the mountains to Turkey and the Kurdish areas of Iran during the Gulf War in 1991. Immigration to Turkey is the process by which people migrate to Turkey to reside in the country. Turkey's migrant crisis in the 2010s and early 2020s resulted in the influx of millions of refugees and immigrants; by 2014, international migrants comprised 2.5% of the country's population. According to the UNHCR, in 2018 Turkey hosted 3,564,919 registered refugees from Africa and the Middle East in total, which corresponded to 63.4% of all refugees in the world. Turkey hosts the largest number of refugees in the world, including 3.6 million Syrian refugees, as of April 2020. The Disaster and Emergency Management Presidency manages the refugee crisis in Turkey.

Languages

The official language is Turkish, which is the most widely spoken Turkic language in the world. It is spoken by 85.54 percent of the population as a first language. 11.97 percent of the population speaks the Kurmanji dialect of Kurdish as their mother tongue. Arabic and Zaza are the mother tongues of 2.39 percent of the population, and several other languages are the mother tongues of smaller parts of the population.

Endangered languages in Turkey include Abaza, Abkhaz, Adyghe, Cappadocian Greek, Gagauz, Hértevin, Homshetsma, Kabard-Cherkes, Ladino (Judesmo), Laz, Mlahso, Pontic Greek, Romani, Suret, Turoyo, Ubykh, and Western Armenian. Megleno-Romanian is also spoken.

Turkey is a founding member of the Organization of Turkic States and International Organization of Turkic Culture, comprising other independent Turkic states, such as Azerbaijan, Kazakhstan, Kyrgyzstan, Turkmenistan and Uzbekistan. It is an intergovernmental organization whose overarching aim is promoting comprehensive cultural cooperation among Turkic-speaking states.

Religion

Turkey is a secular state with no official state religion; the Turkish Constitution provides for freedom of religion and conscience. A 2016 survey by Ipsos, interviewing 17,180 adults across 22 countries, found that Islam was the dominant religion in Turkey, adhered to by 82% of the total population; religiously unaffiliated people comprised 13% of the population, while 2% were Christians. The level of religiosity study by Konda found that 9.7% of the population who are 'fully devoted', 52% who 'strives to fulfill religious obligations', 34.3% who 'does not fulfill religious obligations' and 3.2% 'Nonbeliever/Irreligious'. Another poll conducted by Gezici Araştırma in 2020 interviewed 1,062 people in 12 provinces and found that 28.5% of the Generation Z in Turkey identify as irreligious. 
According to a survey by World Values Survey In 2017 98.0% Identified as Muslims, while 1.2% Identified with no Religion and 0.8 as other.

According to a survey by the pollster KONDA, the percentage of atheists in Turkey has tripled in 10 years and rose from 1% in 2008 to 3% in 2018, the percentage of non-believers or agnostics rose from 1% to 2%, and that 90% of irreligious Turks were under 35 years old. The survey was conducted in Turkey through face-to-face interviews with 5,793 people in their households, in April, 2018 while in 2008 6,482 people were interviewed in face-to-face in Turkey.

The CIA World Factbook reports that Islam is the religion of 99.8% of the population, with Sunni Muslims as the largest sect, while 0.2% are Christians and Jews. However, there are no official governmental statistics specifying the religious beliefs of the Turkish people, nor is religious data recorded in the country's census. Academics suggest the Alevi population may be from 15 to 20 million, while the Alevi-Bektaşi Federation states that there are around 25 million. According to Aksiyon magazine, the number of Twelver Shias (excluding Alevis) is three million (4.2%).

Christianity has a long history in present-day Turkey, which is the birthplace of numerous Christian apostles and saints. Antioch (Antakya) is regarded by tradition as the spot where the Gospels were written, and where the followers of Jesus were called Christians for the first time. Constantinople is generally considered to be the center and the "cradle of Orthodox Christian civilization". The percentage of Christians in Turkey fell from 17.5% (three million followers) in a population of 16 million to 2.5% percent in the early 20th century. mainly as a result of the Armenian genocide, the population exchange between Greece and Turkey and the emigration of Christians that began in the late 19th century and gained pace in the first quarter of the 20th century. Today, there are more than 120,000–320,000 people of various Christian denominations, representing less than 0.2% of Turkey's population, including an estimated 80,000 Oriental Orthodox, 35,000 Roman Catholics, 18,000 Antiochian Greeks, 5,000 Greek Orthodox, smaller numbers of Protestants, and 512 Mormons. Currently, there are 398 churches open for worship in Turkey.

Modern-day Turkey continues to have a small Jewish population; with around 26,000 Jews, the vast majority of whom are Sephardi. Turkey has the biggest Jewish community among the Muslim-majority countries.

In a mid-2010s poll, 2.9% of Turkish respondents identified as atheists. The Association of Atheism, the first official atheist organization in the Balkans and the Middle East, was founded in 2014. Some religious and secular officials have claimed that atheism and deism are growing among Turkish people.

Education

The Ministry of National Education is responsible for pre-tertiary education. This is compulsory and lasts twelve years: four years each of primary school, middle school and high school. All 12 years compulsory education is free of charge in public schools.

Basic education in Turkey is said to lag behind other OECD countries, with significant differences between high and low performers. Access to high-quality school heavily depends on the performance in the secondary school entrance exams, to the point that some students begin taking private tutoring classes when they are ten years old.

As of 2022, there are 209 universities in Turkey. Except for the Open Education Faculties (AÖF) at Anadolu, Istanbul and Atatürk University; entrance is regulated by the national Student Selection and Placement System (ÖSYS) examination, after which high school graduates are assigned to universities according to their performance. According to the 2012–2013 Times Higher Education World University Rankings, the top university in Turkey is Middle East Technical University, followed by Bilkent University and Koç University, Istanbul Technical University and Boğaziçi University. All state and private universities are under the control of the Higher Education Board (YÖK), whose head is appointed by the President of Turkey; and since 2016 the President directly appoints all rectors of all state and private universities.

Turkey is a member of Socrates programme, Erasmus Programme and Erasmus+ Programmes. These student exchange programmes are organized by the European Union. Also it is a member of Erasmus Student Network which is a Europe-wide student organization which has more than 15.000 volunteers across the Europe.

Turkey has become a hub for foreign students in recent years. The number of foreign students in Turkey was 795.962 in 2016. The government has announced a vision to draw around 500,000 foreign students at its universities by offering attractive scholarships. Türkiye Scholarships is international scholarship programme funded by Government of Turkey. In 2021, in response to Türkiye Scholarships, that was advertised in January 2021, Turkish Government received 165,000 applications from 178 countries of the World.

Health

The Ministry of Health has run a universal public healthcare system since 2003. Known as Universal Health Insurance, it is funded by a tax surcharge on employers, currently at 5%. Public-sector funding covers approximately 75.2% of health expenditures. Despite the universal health care, total expenditure on health as a share of GDP in 2018 was the lowest among OECD countries at 6.3% of GDP, compared to the OECD average of 9.3%. The lower health care expenditure is due to lower median age in Turkey which is 32.4, compared to Italy which is 47.3. Aging population is the prime reason for higher healthcare expenditure in the developed world.

Average life expectancy in Turkey is 78.6 years (75.9 for males and 81.3 for females), compared with the EU average of 81 years. Turkey has high rates of obesity, with 29.5% of its adult population having a body mass index (BMI) value that is 30 or above. Air pollution in Turkey is a major cause of early death.

There are many private hospitals in the country. In recent years, Turkey has benefited from medical tourism, which has generated revenues of more than $1 billion in 2019. Around 60% of the income has been obtained from plastic surgery and a total of 662,087 patients have received service in the country within the scope of health tourism in 2019.

Culture

Turkey has a very diverse culture that is a blend of various elements of the Turkic, Anatolian, Byzantine and Ottoman cultures (the latter was in many aspects a continuation of both the Greco-Roman and Islamic cultures) with Western culture and traditions, a process that started with the Westernization of the Ottoman Empire and still continues today. This mix originally began as a result of the encounter of the Turks and their culture with those of the peoples they came across during their migration from Central Asia to the West. Contemporary Turkish culture during the republican period is a product of efforts to create a "modern" Western society, while maintaining traditional, religious and historical values.

Turkish culture has also influenced European art and fashion, particularly between the 16th and 18th centuries, during the peak of Ottoman power — a phenomenon that was called Turquerie.

Visual arts

Ottoman miniature is linked to the Persian miniature tradition and is likewise influenced by Chinese painting styles and techniques. The words tasvir or nakış were used to define the art of miniature painting in Ottoman Turkish. The studios the artists worked in were called nakkaşhane. The miniatures were usually not signed, perhaps because of the rejection of individualism, but also because the works were not created entirely by one person; the head painter designed the composition of the scene, and his apprentices drew the contours (which were called tahrir) with black or coloured ink and then painted the miniature without creating an illusion of depth. The head painter, and much more often the scribe of the text, were indeed named and depicted in some of the manuscripts. The understanding of perspective was different from that of the nearby European Renaissance painting tradition, and the scene depicted often included different time periods and spaces in one picture. They followed closely the context of the book they were included in, more illustrations than standalone works of art. Nakkaş Osman and Matrakçı Nasuh (1480–1564) are among the most prominent artists of this era.

Turkish painting, in the Western sense, developed actively starting from the mid 19th century. The first painting lessons were scheduled at what is now the Istanbul Technical University (then the Imperial Military Engineering School) in 1793, mostly for technical purposes. In the late 19th century, human figure in the Western sense was being established in Turkish painting, especially with Osman Hamdi Bey (1842–1910). Impressionism, among the contemporary trends, appeared later on with Halil Pasha (c.1857–1939). Other important Turkish painters in the 19th century were Ferik İbrahim Paşa (1815–1891), Osman Nuri Paşa (c.1839–1906), Şeker Ahmet Paşa (1841–1907), and Hoca Ali Riza (1864–1939).

The young Turkish artists sent to Europe in 1926 came back inspired by contemporary trends such as Fauvism, Cubism and Expressionism, still very influential in Europe. The later "Group D" of artists led by Abidin Dino, Cemal Tollu, Fikret Mualla, Fahrünnisa Zeid, Bedri Rahmi Eyüboğlu, Adnan Çoker and Burhan Doğançay introduced some trends that had lasted in the West for more than three decades. Other important movements in Turkish painting were the "Yeniler Grubu" (The Newcomers Group) of the late 1930s; the "On'lar Grubu" (Group of Ten) of the 1940s; the "Yeni Dal Grubu" (New Branch Group) of the 1950s; and the "Siyah Kalem Grubu" (Black Pen Group) of the 1960s. Internationally acclaimed Turkish sculptors in the 20th century include Ali Hadi Bara, Zühtü Müridoğlu, İlhan Koman, Kuzgun Acar and Ali Teoman Germaner.

Carpet (halı) and tapestry (kilim) weaving is a traditional Turkish art form with roots in pre-Islamic times. During its long history, the art and craft of weaving carpets and tapestries in Turkey has integrated numerous cultural traditions. Apart from the Turkic design patterns that are prevalent, traces of Persian and Byzantine patterns can also be detected. There are also similarities with the patterns used in Armenian, Caucasian and Kurdish carpet designs. The arrival of Islam in Central Asia and the development of Islamic art also influenced Turkic patterns in the medieval period. The history of the designs, motifs and ornaments used in Turkish carpets and tapestries thus reflects the political and ethnic history of the Turks and the cultural diversity of Anatolia. However, scientific attempts were unsuccessful, as yet, to attribute a particular design to a specific ethnic, regional, or even nomadic versus village tradition.

The earliest examples of Turkish paper marbling, called ebru in Turkish, are said to be a copy of the Hâlnâme by the poet Arifî. The text of this manuscript was rendered in a delicate cut paper découpage calligraphy by Mehmed bin Gazanfer and completed in 1540, and features many marbled and decorative paper borders. One early master by the pseudonym of Şebek is mentioned posthumously in the earliest Ottoman text on the art known as the Tertib-i Risâle-i Ebrî, which is dated based on internal evidence to after 1615. The instructions for several ebru techniques in the text are accredited to this master. Another famous 18th-century master by the name of Hatip Mehmed Efendi (died 1773) is accredited with developing motifs and perhaps early floral designs, although evidence from India appears to contradict some of these reports. Despite this, marbled motifs are commonly referred to as hatip designs in Turkey today.

Literature and theatre

Turkish literature is a mix of cultural influences. Interaction between the Ottoman Empire and the Islamic world along with Europe contributed to a blend of Turkic, Islamic and European traditions in modern-day Turkish music and literary arts. Turkish literature was heavily influenced by Persian and Arabic literature during most of the Ottoman era.

The Tanzimat reforms of the 19th century introduced previously unknown Western genres, primarily the novel and the short story. Many of the writers in the Tanzimat period wrote in several genres simultaneously: for instance, the poet Namık Kemal also wrote the important 1876 novel İntibâh (Awakening), while the journalist Şinasi has written, in 1860, the first modern Turkish play, the one-act comedy "Şair Evlenmesi" (The Poet's Marriage). Most of the roots of modern Turkish literature were formed between the years 1896 and 1923. Broadly, there were three primary literary movements during this period: the Edebiyat-ı Cedîde (New Literature) movement; the Fecr-i Âtî (Dawn of the Future) movement; and the Millî Edebiyat (National Literature) movement.

The first radical step of innovation in 20th century Turkish poetry was taken by Nâzım Hikmet, who introduced the free verse style. Another revolution in Turkish poetry came about in 1941 with the Garip movement led by Orhan Veli, Oktay Rıfat and Melih Cevdet.

The mix of cultural influences in Turkey is dramatized, for example, in the form of the "new symbols of the clash and interlacing of cultures" enacted in the novels of Orhan Pamuk, recipient of the 2006 Nobel Prize in Literature.

The origin of Turkish theater dates back to ancient pagan rituals and oral legends. The dances, music and songs performed during the rituals of the inhabitants of Anatolia millennia ago are the elements from which the first shows originated. In time, the ancient rituals, myths, legends and stories evolved into theatrical shows. Starting from the 11th-century, the traditions of the Seljuk Turks blended with those of the indigenous peoples of Anatolia and the interaction between diverse cultures paved the way for new plays. Meddah were storytellers who performed in front of audiences during the Ottoman period. Karagöz and Hacivat are the lead characters of the traditional Turkish shadow play, popularized during the Ottoman period and then spread to most ethnic groups of the Ottoman Empire.

After the Tanzimat (Reformation) period in the 19th century, characters in Turkish theatre were modernized and plays were performed on European-style stages, with actors wearing European costumes. Following the restoration of constitutional monarchy with the Young Turk Revolution in 1908, theatrical activities increased and social problems began to be reflected at the theatre as well as in historical plays. A theatrical conservatoire, Darülbedayi-i Osmani (which became the nucleus of the Istanbul City Theatres) was established in 1914. During the years of chaos and war, the Darülbedayi-i Osmani continued its activities and attracted the younger generation. Numerous Turkish playwrights emerged in this era; some of them wrote on romantic subjects, while others were interested in social problems, and still others dealt with nationalistic themes. The first Turkish musicals were also written in this period. In time, Turkish women began to appear on stage, which was an important development in the late Ottoman society. Until then, female roles had only been played by actresses who were members of Turkey's ethnic minorities. Today there are numerous private theatres in the country, together with those which are subsidized by the government, such as the Turkish State Theatres.

Music and dance

Music of Turkey includes mainly Turkic elements as well as partial influences ranging from Central Asian folk music, Arabic music, Greek music, Ottoman music, Persian music and Balkan music, as well as references to more modern European and American popular music. The roots of traditional music in Turkey span across centuries to a time when the Seljuk Turks migrated to Anatolia and Persia in the 11th century and contains elements of both Turkic and pre-Turkic influences. Much of its modern popular music can trace its roots to the emergence in the early 1930s drive for Westernization.

With the assimilation of immigrants from various regions the diversity of musical genres and musical instrumentation also expanded. Turkey has also seen documented folk music and recorded popular music produced in the ethnic styles of Greek, Armenian, Albanian, Polish and Jewish communities, among others.

Many Turkish cities and towns have vibrant local music scenes which, in turn, support a number of regional musical styles. Despite this however, western music styles like pop music and kanto lost popularity to arabesque in the late 1970s and 1980s. It became popular again by the beginning of the 1990s, as a result of an opening economy and society. The resurging popularity of pop music gave rise to several international Turkish pop stars such as Ajda Pekkan, Sezen Aksu, Erol Evgin, MFÖ, Tarkan, Sertab Erener, Teoman, Kenan Doğulu, Levent Yüksel and Hande Yener. Internationally acclaimed Turkish jazz and blues musicians and composers include Ahmet Ertegun (founder and president of Atlantic Records), Nükhet Ruacan and Kerem Görsev.

The Turkish Five is a name used by some authors to identify the five pioneers of Western classical music in Turkey, namely Ahmed Adnan Saygun, Ulvi Cemal Erkin, Cemal Reşit Rey, Hasan Ferit Alnar and Necil Kazım Akses. Internationally acclaimed Turkish musicians of Western classical music include pianists İdil Biret, Verda Erman, Gülsin Onay, the Pekinel sisters (Güher and Süher Pekinel), Ayşegül Sarıca and Fazıl Say; violinists Ayla Erduran and Suna Kan; opera singers Semiha Berksoy, Leyla Gencer and Güneş Gürle; and conductors Emre Aracı, Gürer Aykal, Erol Erdinç, Rengim Gökmen and Hikmet Şimşek.

Turkish folk dance is diverse. Hora is performed in East Thrace; Zeybek in the Aegean Region, Southern Marmara and East-Central Anatolia Region; Teke in the Western Mediterranean Region; Kaşık Oyunları and Karşılama in West-Central Anatolia, Western Black Sea Region, Southern Marmara Region and Eastern Mediterranean Region; Horon in the Central and Eastern Black Sea Region; Halay in Eastern Anatolia and the Central Anatolia Region; and Bar and Lezginka in the Northeastern Anatolia Region.

Architecture

The Byzantine era is usually dated from 330 AD, when Constantine the Great moved the Roman capital to Byzantium, which became Constantinople, until the fall of the Byzantine Empire in 1453. Its architecture dramatically influenced the later medieval architecture throughout Europe and the Near East, and became the primary progenitor of the Renaissance and Ottoman architectural traditions that followed its collapse. When the Roman Empire went Christian (as well as eastwards) with Constantinople as its new capital, its architecture became more sensuous and more ambitious. This new style, which would come to be known as Byzantine architecture, with increasingly exotic domes and ever-richer mosaics, spread west to Ravenna and Venice in Italy, and as far north as Moscow in Russia. This influence can be seen particularly in the Venetian Gothic architecture.

The architecture of the Seljuk Turks combined the elements and characteristics of the Turkic architecture of Central Asia with those of Persian, Arab, Armenian and Byzantine architecture. The transition from Seljuk architecture to Ottoman architecture is most visible in Bursa, which was the capital of the Ottoman State between 1335 and 1413. Following the Ottoman conquest of Constantinople (Istanbul) in 1453, Ottoman architecture was significantly influenced by Byzantine architecture. Topkapı Palace in Istanbul is one of the most famous examples of classical Ottoman architecture and was the primary residence of the Ottoman Sultans for approximately 400 years. Mimar Sinan (c.1489–1588) was the most important architect of the classical period in Ottoman architecture. He was the chief architect of at least 374 buildings that were constructed in various provinces of the Ottoman Empire in the 16th century. Sedefkar Mehmed Ağa, the architect of the Blue Mosque in Istanbul, was an apprentice of Mimar Sinan, later becoming his first assistant in charge of the office of chief architect during his absence. Mimar Sinan's works had a significant influence on Sedefkar Mehmed Ağa.

Since the 18th century, Turkish architecture has been increasingly influenced by European styles, and this can be particularly seen in the Tanzimat era buildings of Istanbul like the Dolmabahçe, Çırağan, Taksim Military Barracks (demolished), Feriye, Beylerbeyi, Küçüksu, Ihlamur and Yıldız palaces, which were all designed by members of the Balyan family of Ottoman Armenian court architects. The Ottoman era waterfront houses (yalı) on the Bosphorus also reflect the fusion between classical Ottoman and European architectural styles during the aforementioned period. Italian architect, Raimondo D'Aronco served as the chief palace architect to the Ottoman Sultan Abdülhamid II in Istanbul for 16 years. D'Aronco designed and built a large number of buildings of various types in Istanbul. The stylistic features of his works can be classified in three groups: Revivalism, reinterpretation of the Ottoman forms, Art Nouveau and Vienna Secession. Art Nouveau was first introduced to Istanbul by D'Aronco, and his designs reveal that he drew freely on Byzantine and Ottoman decorations. He also mixed Western and Oriental styles in his work.

The First National Architectural Movement in the early 20th century sought to create a new architecture, which was based on motifs from Seljuk and Ottoman architecture. The leading architects of this movement were Vedat Tek (1873–1942), Mimar Kemaleddin Bey (1870–1927), Arif Hikmet Koyunoğlu (1888–1982) and Giulio Mongeri (1873–1953). Buildings from this era are the Grand Post Office in Istanbul (1905–1909), Tayyare Apartments (1919–1922), Istanbul 4th Vakıf Han (1911–1926), State Art and Sculpture Museum (1927–1930), Ethnography Museum of Ankara (1925–1928), the first Ziraat Bank headquarters in Ankara (1925–1929), the first Türkiye İş Bankası headquarters in Ankara (1926–1929), and Bebek Mosque.

Cuisine

Turkish cuisine is largely the heritage of Ottoman cuisine. In the early years of the Republic, a few studies were published about regional Anatolian dishes but cuisine did not feature heavily in Turkish folkloric studies until the 1980s, when the fledgling tourism industry encouraged the Turkish state to sponsor two food symposia. The papers submitted at the symposia presented the history of Turkish cuisine on a "historical continuum" that dated back to Turkic origins in Central Asia and continued through the Seljuk and Ottoman periods.

Many of the papers presented at these first two symposia were unreferenced. Prior to the symposia, the study of Turkish culinary culture was first popularized by the publication of Süheyl Ünver's Fifty Dishes in Turkish History in 1948. This book was based on recipes found in an 18th century Ottoman manuscript. His second book was about the 15th century palace cuisine during the reign of Sultan Mehmed II. Following the publication of Ünver's book, subsequent studies were published, including a 1978 study by a historian named Bahaettin Ögel about the Central Asian origins of Turkish cuisine.

Ottoman cuisine contains elements of Turkish, Byzantine, Balkan, Armenian, Georgian, Kurdish,  Arab and Persian cuisines. It can be described as a fusion and refinement of Mediterranean, Middle Eastern, Central Asian, Balkan and Eastern European cuisines. The country's position between Europe, Asia and the Mediterranean Sea helped the Turks in gaining complete control of the major trade routes, and an ideal landscape and climate allowed plants and animals to flourish. Turkish cuisine was well established by the mid-1400s, which marked the beginning of the classical age during the Ottoman Empire's 623-year history. Yogurt salads; mezes; fish and seafood; grilled, sauteed or steamed meat varieties; vegetables or stuffed and wrapped vegetables cooked with olive oil; and drinks like sherbet, ayran and rakı became Turkish staples. The empire, eventually spanning from Austria and Ukraine in the north to Yemen and Sudan in the south, Algeria and the Maghreb in the west to the Caspian Sea and Persian Gulf in the east, used its land and water routes to import exotic ingredients from all over the world. By the end of the 16th century, the Ottoman court housed over 1,400 live-in cooks and passed laws regulating the freshness of food. Since the fall of the empire in World War I (1914–1918) and the establishment of the Turkish Republic in 1923, foreign food such as French hollandaise sauce and Western fast food have made their way into the modern Turkish diet.

Sports

The most popular sport in Turkey is association football. Galatasaray won the UEFA Cup and UEFA Super Cup in 2000. The Turkish national football team won the bronze medal at the 2002 FIFA World Cup, the 2003 FIFA Confederations Cup and UEFA Euro 2008.

Other mainstream sports such as basketball and volleyball are also popular. The men's national basketball team won the silver medal at the 2010 FIBA World Championship and at EuroBasket 2001, which were both hosted by Turkey; and is one of the most successful at the Mediterranean Games. Anadolu Efes S.K., the most successful Turkish basketball club in international competitions, won the 2021–22 EuroLeague, 2020–21 EuroLeague and the 1995–96 FIBA Korać Cup; were the runners-up of the 2018–19 EuroLeague and the 1992–93 FIBA Saporta Cup; and finished third at the 1999–2000 EuroLeague and the 2000–01 SuproLeague. When the 2019–20 EuroLeague Regular Season was suspended on 12 March 2020 due to the COVID-19 pandemic, Anadolu Efes S.K. ranked 1st in the league table. Another successful Turkish basketball club, Fenerbahçe reached the Final of the EuroLeague in three consecutive seasons (2016, 2017 and 2018), becoming the European champions in 2017 and runners-up in 2016 and 2018. Galatasaray won the 2015–16 Eurocup, and Beşiktaş won the 2011–12 FIBA EuroChallenge. The Final of the 2013–14 EuroLeague Women basketball championship was played between two Turkish teams, Galatasaray and Fenerbahçe, and won by Galatasaray. The women's national basketball team won the silver medal at the EuroBasket Women 2011 and the bronze medal at the EuroBasket Women 2013. Like the men's team, the women's basketball team is one of the most successful at the Mediterranean Games.

The women's national volleyball team won the gold medal at the 2015 European Games, the silver medal at the 2003 European Championship, the bronze medal at the 2011 European Championship, and the bronze medal at the 2012 FIVB World Grand Prix. They also won multiple medals over multiple decades at the Mediterranean Games. Women's volleyball clubs, namely Fenerbahçe, Eczacıbaşı and Vakıfbank, have won numerous European championship titles and medals. Fenerbahçe won the 2010 FIVB Women's Club World Championship and the 2012 CEV Women's Champions League. Representing Europe as the winner of the 2012–13 CEV Women's Champions League, Vakıfbank also became the world champion by winning the 2013 FIVB Volleyball Women's Club World Championship. Recently Vakıfbank has won the FIVB Volleyball Women's Club World Championship in 2017 and 2018, and the 2017–18 CEV Women's Champions League for the fourth time in their history.

The traditional national sport of Turkey has been yağlı güreş (oil wrestling) since Ottoman times. Edirne Province has hosted the annual Kırkpınar oil wrestling tournament since 1361, making it the oldest continuously held sporting competition in the world. In the 19th and early 20th centuries, Ottoman Turkish oil wrestling champions such as Koca Yusuf, Nurullah Hasan and Kızılcıklı Mahmut acquired international fame in Europe and North America by winning world heavyweight wrestling championship titles. International wrestling styles governed by FILA such as freestyle wrestling and Greco-Roman wrestling are also popular, with many European, World and Olympic championship titles won by Turkish wrestlers both individually and as a national team.

Media and cinema

Hundreds of television channels, thousands of local and national radio stations, several dozen newspapers, a productive and profitable national cinema and a rapid growth of broadband Internet use constitute a vibrant media industry in Turkey. The majority of the TV audiences are shared among public broadcaster TRT and the network-style channels such as Kanal D, Show TV, ATV and Star TV. The broadcast media have a very high penetration as satellite dishes and cable systems are widely available. The Radio and Television Supreme Council (RTÜK) is the government body overseeing the broadcast media. By circulation, the most popular newspapers are Posta, Hürriyet, Sözcü, Sabah and Habertürk.

TRT 2 is the public service channel dedicated to culture and art, and TRT Belgesel is dedicated to documentaries. In the 21st century some reforms have taken place to improve the cultural rights of ethnic minorities in Turkey, such as the establishment of TRT Kurdî, TRT Arabi and TRT Avaz by the TRT.

Turkish television dramas are increasingly becoming popular beyond Turkey's borders and are among the country's most vital exports, both in terms of profit and public relations. After sweeping the Middle East's television market over the past decade, Turkish shows have aired in more than a dozen South and Central American countries in 2016. Turkey is today the world's second largest exporter of television series.

Yeşilçam is the sobriquet that refers to the Turkish film art and industry. The first movie exhibited in the Ottoman Empire was the Lumiere Brothers' 1895 film, L'Arrivée d'un train en gare de La Ciotat, which was shown in Istanbul in 1896. The first Turkish-made film was a documentary entitled Ayastefanos'taki Rus Abidesinin Yıkılışı (Demolition of the Russian Monument at San Stefano), directed by Fuat Uzkınay and completed in 1914. The first narrative film, Sedat Simavi's The Spy, was released in 1917. Turkey's first sound film was shown in 1931. Turkish directors like Metin Erksan, Nuri Bilge Ceylan, Yılmaz Güney, Zeki Demirkubuz and Ferzan Özpetek won numerous international awards such as the Palme d'Or and Golden Bear.

Despite legal provisions, media freedom in Turkey has steadily deteriorated from 2010 onwards, with a precipitous decline following the failed coup attempt on 15 July 2016. As of December 2016, at least 81 journalists were imprisoned in Turkey and more than 100 news outlets were closed. Freedom House lists Turkey's media as not free. The media crackdowns also extend to Internet censorship with Wikipedia getting blocked between 29 April 2017 and 15 January 2020.

See also

 Index of Turkey-related articles
 Outline of Turkey

References

Further reading

 
 
 Reed, Fred A. (1999). Anatolia Junction: a Journey into Hidden Turkey. Burnaby, BC: Talonbooks [sic]. 320 p., ill. with b&w photos. 
 
 Roxburgh, David J. (ed.) (2005). Turks: A Journey of a Thousand Years, 600–1600. Royal Academy of Arts. .
 .
 .

External links

General
 turkey.com – Topical multilingual website about Turkey.
 Turkey from UCB Libraries GovPubs
 Data on Turkey from OECD
 
 
Tourism
 
 Go Türkiye – Turkey's official tourism portal
 Official website of the Ministry of Culture and Tourism
 
Government
 Official website of the Presidency of the Republic of Turkey
 Official website of the Grand National Assembly of Turkey 
Economy
 Official website of Ministry of the Ministry of Economy

 
Eastern Mediterranean
E7 nations
G20 nations
Member states of NATO
Member states of the Council of Europe
Member states of the Union for the Mediterranean
Member states of the United Nations
Middle Eastern countries
Near Eastern countries
Newly industrializing countries
Republics
States and territories established in 1923
Southern European countries
Balkan countries
Southeastern European countries
Western Asian countries
Countries in Asia
Turkish-speaking countries and territories
Kurdish-speaking countries and territories
Turkey
Transcontinental countries
Developing 8 Countries member states
Members of the International Organization of Turkic Culture
Member states of the Organization of Turkic States